Wanted: A Leading Lady is a 1915 silent short comedy directed by Al Christie. It stars Eddie Lyons, Lee Moran and Betty Compson in her film debut.

Cast
Eddie Lyons - Eddie
Lee Moran - Lee
Betty Compson - The Leading Lady
George B. French - The Director
Gus Alexander - Gus
Ethel Lynne -
Ray Gallagher - 
Billie Rhodes -
Harry Rattenberry
Stella Adams

See also
Betty Compson filmography

References

External links
 Wanted: A Leading Lady at IMDb.com

1915 films
1915 short films
American silent short films
Films directed by Al Christie
American black-and-white films
Universal Pictures short films
Silent American comedy films
1915 comedy films
1910s American films